Marian Simion (born 14 September 1975 in București) is a Romanian boxer, who competed in the Light Middleweight (71 kg) at the 2000 Summer Olympics and won the silver medal. He repeated that feat one year later, at the 2001 World Amateur Boxing Championships in Belfast after having won the world title at the previous tournament in Houston, Texas, United States.

He is the older brother of Olympic boxer Dorel Simion. Simion qualified for the 2004 Summer Olympics by ending up in first place at the 2nd AIBA European 2004 Olympic Qualifying Tournament in Warsaw, Poland.

Olympic results 
1996
Defeated Hussein Bayram (France) 13-6
Defeated Fernando Vargas (United States) 8-7
Defeated Hassan Al (Denmark) 16-8
Lost to Juan Hernández Sierra (Cuba) 7-20

2000
Defeated Ciro di Corcia (Italy) 19-8
Defeated José Luis Zertuche (Mexico) RSC 3
Defeated Frédéric Esther (France) RSC 3
Defeated Pornchai Thongburan (Thailand) 26-16
Lost to Yermakhan Ibraimov (Kazakhstan) 23-25

2004
Lost to Ramadan Yasser (Egypt) 29-36

External links

1975 births
Living people
Olympic boxers of Romania
Boxers at the 1996 Summer Olympics
Boxers at the 2000 Summer Olympics
Boxers at the 2004 Summer Olympics
Olympic silver medalists for Romania
Sportspeople from Bucharest
Olympic medalists in boxing
Romanian male boxers
AIBA World Boxing Championships medalists
Medalists at the 2000 Summer Olympics
Medalists at the 1996 Summer Olympics
Olympic bronze medalists for Romania
Welterweight boxers
Romanian Romani people